Xanthocastnia is a genus of moths within the family Castniidae containing only one species, Xanthocastnia evalthe, which is widespread in the Neotropical realm, ranging from southern Mexico to southern Brazil.

Adults are day-flying.

Subspecies
Xanthocastnia evalthe evalthe (Suriname)
Xanthocastnia evalthe cuyabensis Lathy, 1922 (Brazil)
Xanthocastnia evalthe euphrosyne (Perty, 1833) (Brazil)
Xanthocastnia evalthe evalthoides (Strand, 1913) (Bolivia)
Xanthocastnia evalthe quadrata (Rothschild, 1919) (Peru)
Xanthocastnia evalthe vicina (Houlbert, 1917) (Ecuador)
Xanthocastnia evalthe vicinoides (Hopp, 1925) (Colombia)
Xanthocastnia evalthe viryi (Boisduval, [1875]) (Mexico)
Xanthocastnia evalthe wagneri (Buchecker, [1880]) (Colombia)
Xanthocastnia evalthe tica Lamas, 1995 (Costa Rica)

References

External links

Moths described in 1775
Castniidae